The Amazing Awang Khenit is a Malaysian animated children's television series produced by SEAD Studios. Launched in 2014, the show incorporates elements of Malaysian folklore and slapstick comedy.

The original trailer for the show was one of 20 winners of the MSC IPPC award for the animation category, and finished third in the 2012 TBS DigiCon6 short film and animation contest. In 2015 it was nominated for Best animated series at the Malaysia Film Festival. As of the same year, the show was viewed weekly by an audience of 2.4 million. Originally airing on TV9, Awang Khenit moved to the Mediacorp Suria channel in January 2016.

Synopsis
The main character, Awang Khenit, is unable to grow up after being cursed by a wizard at the age of ten, who Awang believes, has also kidnapped his parents. Using various super powers, Awang protects the fictional town of Indrasakti from the series' villains.

Broadcast
<onlyinclude>

On 23 March 2019, The Amazing Awang Khenit Official facebook page updated that they back with a new season and episodes. Season 2 starts aired on TV3, at Saturdays on 10.30 am and later, moved to Fridays on 5:00 pm.

Character
 Awang Khenit - the main character who has been cursed unable to grow up.
 Badang 
 Puteri Melati
 Tun Berong
 Raja Mustafar
 Seri Bibah
 Erni Susila

Episodes

Season 1 (2014 - 2015)

Season 2 (2019)

References

External links
The Amazing Awang Khenit -Official on Facebook
The Amazing Awang Khenit on Instagram

2014 Malaysian television series debuts
Malaysian children's animated action television series
Malaysian children's animated adventure television series
Malaysian children's animated comedy television series
TV9 (Malaysia) original programming
TV3 (Malaysia) original programming